Two ships of the French Navy have borne the name Dégo:
 , a gunboat taken from the Venetian navy
 , a 64-gun ship of the line taken from the Maltese Navy

French Navy ship names